Khak-e Ali (also Romanized as Khāk-e ‘Alī, Khak ‘Alī, Khāk-i- ‘Ali; formerly, Khāqlīn) is a city and capital of Basharyat District, in Abyek County, Qazvin Province, Iran. At the 2006 census its population was 3,146, in 790 families.

References 

Abyek County
Cities in Qazvin Province